IMSP is Internet Message Support Protocol. Defined in a 1995 Internet Draft, which carries this abstract:

Work on standardizing IMSP was never completed because it was superseded by the ACAP protocol, which provides a superset of IMSP's functionality.

Implementations 
 An IMSP server is available for download from CMU.
 The Horde PHP framework and applications have IMSP support.
 Mulberry supports IMSP storage of mail preferences and address books.
 Silkymail (discontinued) supported IMSP storage of mail preferences and address books. Address books were shared with Mulberry.
 Simeon (discontinued) supported IMSP storage of mail preferences and address books.
 An IMSP address book plugin is available for SquirrelMail.

Internet mail protocols